Miz & Mrs. is an American reality television series that premiered on July 24, 2018 on USA Network. The series, a spin-off of Total Divas, follows the lives of Mike "The Miz" Mizanin and Maryse Mizanin in and out of the wrestling ring. The show includes fifty 30-minute episodes. Season 1 follows the couple leading up to the birth of their first child. Mike and Maryse also serve as executive producers of the show. In April 2019, USA Network renewed the series for a second season which premiered on January 29, 2020.

Production
On January 8, 2018, WWE announced that Mike and Maryse would be getting their own spinoff show, set to premiere in 2018 on USA Network, titled Miz & Mrs., that would follow the personal lives of the couple.

On March 27, 2018, Maryse gave birth to their daughter, Monroe Sky Mizanin.

On May 22, 2018, it was announced that the series would premiere on July 24, 2018.

On August 14, 2018, it was announced that USA Network had ordered additional episodes for the first season, following the success of the first six episodes. In February 2019, it was announced that the additional 14 episodes would begin airing on April 2, 2019. In June 2019, it was announced that Miz and Mrs. would return with new episodes rounding out its first season on Tuesday, August 6, 2019.

On April 2, 2019, USA Network renewed the show for a 20-episode second season, which premiered on January 29, 2020. In February 2021, it was announced by USA Network that the second half of season two would premiere on April 12, 2021.

On October 14, 2021, it was announced that the show was renewed for a 10-episode third season, which premiered on June 6, 2022.

Cast

Main cast
Mike "The Miz" Mizanin 
Maryse Mizanin

Recurring cast
Marjolaine "Marjo" Martin (Maryse's mother)
George Mizanin (The Miz's father)
Barbara Pappas (The Miz's mother)
Ryan Cabrera (The Miz's friend)
John Morrison (seasons 1–2; The Miz's friend and teammate)

Guest stars

Alexa Bliss
Asuka
Avril Lavigne
Brie Bella
Carmella
Curt Hawkins
Dana Brooke
Dennis Haskins
Dolph Ziggler
Elias
Eric Young
Heath Slater
James Roday
Kofi Kingston
Liv Morgan
Nia Jax
Nikki Bella
Paige
Renee Young
Ricochet
Ronda Rousey
Roman Reigns
Rosa Mendes
Ryan Lochte
Sonya Deville
Tamina
Titus O'Neil
Tyler Breeze
Witney Carson
Xavier Woods

Episodes

Series overview

Season 1 (2018–19)

Season 2 (2020–21)

Season 3 (2022)

References

External links
 
 
 
 

2010s American reality television series
2018 American television series debuts
English-language television shows
Television series by Bunim/Murray Productions
Total Divas
USA Network original programming
2020s American reality television series
American television spin-offs
Reality television spin-offs